Bonner is an unincorporated community in Morrill County, Nebraska, United States.

History
Bonner was located on the Chicago, Burlington and Quincy Railroad. The community was likely named for a settler.

References

External links

Unincorporated communities in Morrill County, Nebraska
Unincorporated communities in Nebraska